Mary Pilon (born 16 May 1986 in Eugene, Oregon) is an American journalist who primarily writes about sports and business. A regular contributor to the New Yorker and Bloomberg Businessweek, her books are The Monopolists (2015) and The Kevin Show (2018). The former is being developed into a feature film. She has also worked as a staff reporter covering sports for The New York Times and has also written for Vice, Esquire, NBC News, among other outlets.

At the Times, Pilon authored "Tomato Can Blues," a true-crime story of Charles Rowan; the story was the first-ever graphic novel for the paper and its first audiobook, narrated by actor Bobby Cannavale. Her 2016 investigative reporting on sexual harassment in the trucking industry helped fuel a class action lawsuit by women truckers. In reporting on the NFL's domestic violence policies for Bleacher Report/CNN the next year, Pilon found that the league seldom enforced its own policies. She has also reported on the circumstances surrounding runner Steve Prefontaine`s death for ESPN's Grantland and was among the first to report on Donald Trump's immigrant mother in June 2016.

She is an adjunct professor at NYU's Carter Institute of Journalism, where she teaches a graduate-level investigative reporting class.

Early life and education
Born and raised in Eugene, Oregon, Pilon attended the city's Winston Churchill High School. She first reported for her hometown newspaper, The Register-Guard, as a teenager. She then attended New York University, a member of the graduating class of 2008 with a degree in politics and journalism. Her senior thesis on the people and politics of methamphetamine trafficking won the school's Edwin Diamond Award.

Career
Pilon has worked for Dow Jones, USA Today and New York Magazine and, from 2006 to 2008, Gawker. From 2008 to 2011, she reported for the Wall Street Journal Money and Investing Section on finance and Wall Street during the financial crisis, one of the youngest reporters on staff. She won the 2011 Gerald Loeb Award for Breaking News for her coverage of the 2010 Flash Crash. Her New Yorker contributions focus on the legal and financial aspects of sports.

At the Times, Pilon wrote "Tomato Can Blues," a true-crime story of Charles Rowan, an amateur cage fighter who faked his own death. The story was the first-ever graphic novel for the paper and the first audiobook, narrated by actor Bobby Cannavale.

On 17 February 2015, Bloomsbury released her first book, The Monopolists: Obsession, Fury, and the Scandal Behind the World's Favorite Board Game, which tells the true story of the board game Monopoly. Pilon spent more than five years investigating the game's origins, which date back to feminist Lizzie Magie and the Progressive Era. The book discusses economics professor Ralph Anspach's decade-long legal battle over the rights to his own game, Anti-Monopoly, as well as his efforts to uncover Magie as the game's true inventor, even as Parker Brothers had incorrectly claimed that a man, Charles Darrow, had invented the game during the Great Depression. (Magie died in 1948 in obscurity, working as a secretary in Washington, D.C. and made $500 off her invention.) The book was a quick bestseller and received to critical acclaim, including positive reviews in Slate, the Los Angeles Times, the New Republic, and the Boston Globe, among others. Journalist Gay Talese said that Pilon "writes with the assurance and energy of a historian who knows she has struck gold."

As a result of Pilon's reporting, Magie and Ralph Anspach's lawsuit and efforts to unearth her story have resulted in Magie being acknowledged by a variety of news outlets, academics, the National Women's History Museum, and as a Jeopardy! clue. The book has been translated into several languages and is currently in development as a feature film by the production company behind Little Miss Sunshine and Adaptation.

Pilon's 2016 investigative reporting on sexual harassment in the trucking industry helped fuel a class action lawsuit by women truckers. In reporting on the NFL's domestic violence policies for Bleacher Report/CNN the next year, the writer found that the league seldom enforced its own policies. She has also reported on the circumstances surrounding runner Steve Prefontaine`s death for ESPN's Grantland. She also was among the first to report on Donald Trump's immigrant mother in June 2016.

Pilon has also written for Vice, Esquire, NBC Sports, including items on the 2016 and 2018 Olympics for the latter. She has also had articles published in Fast Company, Smithsonian Magazine, and Medium.

The Kevin Show tells the true story of Olympic and America`s Cup sailor Kevin Hall, who has battled a rare form of bipolar disorder known as the Truman Show Delusion. The book, released by Bloomsbury in March 2018, is a four-year culmination of reporting on Hall's delusions, the reality of being an Olympian, and an examination of mental illness. The book was a national bestseller and received positive reviews. Kirkus Reviews called it "grippingly provocative reading" and psychiatrist Dr. Edward Hallowell called it "spellbinding" and "brilliant."

Books
The Monopolists: Obsession, Fury, and the Scandal Behind the World's Favorite Board Game, 2015
The Kevin Show: An Olympic Athlete's Battle with Mental Illness, 2018

Personal life
Pilon has cited her upbringing in Eugene and early love of comic books among her inspirations. She took a Greyhound to New York City and now lives in Brooklyn.

References

External links
 The New Yorker author page
 The New York Times author page
 Mary Pilon, Sports reporter, New York Times, 25 from Forbes 30 Under 30: Media
 WSJ names asset management reporter
 Q and A with Jezebel
 Official website

Living people
American women journalists
1986 births
Journalists from Oregon
Writers from Eugene, Oregon
The Wall Street Journal people
New York University alumni
21st-century American journalists
21st-century American women writers
Gerald Loeb Award winners for Breaking News
Investigative journalists